Tracy-sur-Mer (literally Tracy on Sea) is a commune in the Calvados department in the Normandy region in northwestern France.

History
The village was part of the west flank of the British 50th (Northumbrian) Infantry Division during the first days of the D-day invasion, in close proximity to the port of Arromanches-les-Bains, also known as Gold Beach.

Sights
Tracy-sur-Mer has a church dedicated to Saint Martin. The building was largely reconstructed in the nineteenth century, but some masonry of the original thirteenth century church remains in the choir.  The bell tower was built in 1957.

Population

See also
Communes of the Calvados department

References

Communes of Calvados (department)
Calvados communes articles needing translation from French Wikipedia
Populated coastal places in France